The 2021–22 Oakland Golden Grizzlies men's basketball team represented Oakland University in the 2021–22 NCAA Division I men's basketball season. The Golden Grizzlies, led by 38th-year head coach Greg Kampe, played their home games at the Athletics Center O'rena in Auburn Hills, Michigan as members of the Horizon League. They finished the season 20–12, 12–7 in Horizon League play to finish in fifth place. They defeated IUPUI in the first round of the Horizon League tournament before losing to Wright State in the quarterfinals. They declined an invitation to The Basketball Classic postseason tournament due to injuries to several players.

Previous season 
In a season limited due to the ongoing COVID-19 pandemic, the Golden Grizzlies finished the 2020–21 season 12–18, 10–10 in Horizon League play to finish in fifth place. They defeated Youngstown State and Northern Kentucky in the Horizon League tournament before losing to Cleveland State in the championship game.

Roster

Schedule and results

|-
!colspan=12 style=| Exhibition

|-
!colspan=12 style=| Regular season

|-
!colspan=12 style=| Horizon League tournament

References

Oakland Golden Grizzlies men's basketball seasons
Oakland Golden Grizzlies
Oakland Golden Grizzlies men's basketball
Oakland Golden Grizzlies men's basketball